The Citroën Junior Team was a World Rally Championship team that competed in the 2009, 2010 and 2012 seasons. It was established as a second team for the Citroën brand and was presented as a vehicle to develop young talent.

The team was also the flagship WRC team for Citroën Racing's customer racing department, Citroën Racing Technologies (CRT), which was in existence between 2007 and 2012. As with all of CRT's customer privateers and team, the Citroën Junior Team was run on events by third-party preparation firm PH Sport.

History

Background 
PH Sport and Citroën Sport Technologies ran semi-privateer Citroën C4 WRCs for Conrad Rautenbach and Urmo Aava during the 2008 World Rally Championship season.

2009 

The Citroën Junior Team was formed in 2009 following the withdrawal of manufacturers Subaru and Suzuki. It ran Citroën C4s for Russian Evgeny Novikov, Zimbabwean Conrad Rautenbach and Junior World Rally Championship champion Sébastien Ogier. It ran former Subaru driver Chris Atkinson rather than Novikov on the season-opening Rally Ireland, although despite a good performance, the Australian did not feature in the team again. Petter Solberg was nominated to score manufacturer points for the team at Rally GB. Solberg finished fourth there, with another driver of Citroën Junior Team Aaron Burkart finishing 12th in his first WRC rally with WRC car.

2010 
On 4 December 2009, it was announced that  Formula One World Champion Kimi Räikkönen would drive for the Junior Team for his switch to rallying. Räikkönen's co-driver would be Kaj Lindström who had partnered multiple world champion Tommi Mäkinen in the past, while Sébastien Ogier and co-driver Julien Ingrassia were in a second car for the Junior Team.

Räikkönen and Lindström contested 12 out of the 13 rounds in the 2010 WRC season, missing only the Rally of New Zealand. They did not start at 2010 Rally Catalunya because of a crash at the pre-event shakedown.

Sébastien Ogier claimed Citroën Junior Team's best result, winning at 2010 Rally de Portugal. Because of his strong finishes he was promoted to Citroën World Rally Team for gravel rallies (Finland, Japan, Wales) while Dani Sordo switched to Citroën Junior Team for those rallies. The best result for Kimi Räikkönen was 5th place at 2010 Rally of Turkey.

2011 
The 'Junior Team' banner was dropped for 2011 as Ogier was promoted to the Citroën World Rally Team. A change in WRC regulations allowed customers of Citroën Racing Technologies to each enter in their own teams with just one car. Petter Solberg, Peter van Merksteijn Jr. and Kimi Räikkönen entered this way in 2011, still using cars from CRT and operated on event by PH Sport.

2012 
The Junior Team name was revived as Thierry Neuville entered the WRC in a one-car team after a successful two-year campaign in IRC with Peugeot 207 S2000 run by Peugeot BelLux. His best result was fourth at the Rally de France Alsace and he finished the season in seventh position.

2013– 
The Citroën Racing Technologies name disappeared after 2012 as Citroën Racing's customer offerings focused on its new DS3 Regional Rally Car, R5, R3T and R1 cars rather than World Rally Cars. No privateer teams contested the WRC manufacturers' championship again in Citroën World Rally Cars, perhaps arguably with the exception of the Abu Dhabi Total World Rally Team in 2016, which was the existing Citroën World Rally Team without an official manufacturer entry, entered again through PH Sport.

WRC Results

Gallery

See also
Citroën Racing
Citroën World Rally Team
Qatar World Rally Team
ICE 1 Racing
Petter Solberg World Rally Team
Van Merksteijn Motorsport
PH Sport

Notes

References

External links

Citroën Racing homepage
Citroën at wrc.com 

Citroën
World Rally Championship teams
Intercontinental Rally Challenge teams
European Rally Championship teams
French auto racing teams